Apantesis complicata is a moth of the family Erebidae. It was described by Francis Walker in 1865. It is found on south-eastern Vancouver Island and several Gulf Islands of British Columbia and Washington. The habitat consists of dry Garry oak meadows and sandy beaches.

The length of the forewings is 15.7 mm. The ground colour of the forewings is black with pale buff to yellowish-ochre bands. The hindwings are pale whitish yellow, varying to yellow or rarely yellowish orange. The markings are black. Adults are on wing from late May to mid-June.

This species was formerly a member of the genus Grammia, but was moved to Apantesis along with the other species of the genera Grammia, Holarctia, and Notarctia.

References

 

Arctiina
Moths described in 1865